Alina Bykhno is a Ukrainian female rhythmic gymnast. She is member of Ukrainian rhythmic gymnastics national team. She won gold and bronze medals at the 2017 Summer Universiade At the 2018 Rhythmic Gymnastics European Championships in Guadalajara she won two silver medals in team events.

References

Living people
Ukrainian rhythmic gymnasts
Year of birth missing (living people)
Universiade medalists in gymnastics
Universiade gold medalists for Ukraine
Universiade bronze medalists for Ukraine
Gymnasts at the 2019 European Games
European Games silver medalists for Ukraine
European Games medalists in gymnastics
Medalists at the 2017 Summer Universiade
Medalists at the Rhythmic Gymnastics European Championships
People from Bila Tserkva
Sportspeople from Kyiv Oblast
21st-century Ukrainian women